Adolfo Suárez, el presidente is a Spanish biopic television movie aired as two-part miniseries directed by Sergio Cabrera. It originally aired on Antena 3 from 27 January to 3 February 2010. It deals about the life of prime minister Adolfo Suárez, who is portrayed by Ginés García Millán.

Plot 
The fiction dramatises the Adolfo Suárez's political career and personal life during the Francoist dictatorship and the Transition up until his resignation as prime minister in 1981.

Cast

Production and release 
The series was written by Juan Carlos Rubio and Carlos Asorey Brey and directed by Sergio Cabrera. Produced by Antena 3 Films alongside Europroducciones, filming started in late August 2009. It was shot in the provinces of Segovia, Ávila and the Madrid region. Consisting of two episodes featuring a running time of around 70 minutes, the miniseries premiered on 27 January 2010. The first part earned 3,059,000 viewers (15.6% audience share), whereas the second part, aired on 3 February 2010, earned 2,832,000 viewers (16.2% audience share).

References 

Spanish-language television shows
Antena 3 (Spanish TV channel) network series
2010s Spanish drama television series
Spanish biographical television series
Spanish television miniseries
2010 Spanish television series debuts
2010 Spanish television series endings
Cultural depictions of Francisco Franco
Television shows set in Spain
Television shows filmed in Spain
Television series set in the 1970s
Television series set in the 1980s